Middle Street is a tram stop on the Nottingham Express Transit (NET) network in the town of Beeston. It is situated on street track within Middle Street and comprises a single island platform situated between the tracks. The stop is on line 1 of the NET, from Hucknall via the city centre to Beeston and Chilwell. Trams run at frequencies that vary between 4 and 8 trams per hour, depending on the day and time of day.

Middle Street stop opened on 25 August 2015, along with the rest of NET's phase two.

References

External links

Nottingham Express Transit stops
Transport in the Borough of Broxtowe
Beeston, Nottinghamshire
Railway stations in Great Britain opened in 2015